Radio Garowe is a radio station based in Garowe, the administrative capital of the autonomous Puntland region in northeastern Somalia. Established in 2004, the broadcaster transmits programs daily on 89.8 FM. In May 2013, Radio Garowe launched an additional FM station in Bosaso.

See also
Garowe Online
Radio Mogadishu
Radio Gaalkacyo
Radio Kulmis
Radio Laascaanood
Media of Somalia

Notes

References
 Garowe Online Profile - MondoTimes.com

Radio stations in Somalia
Mass media in Garowe
Somali-language radio stations
2004 establishments in Somalia